Miguel Angel Lopez (born 1 March 1942 in Argentina), nicknamed Zurdo, is an Argentinean retired footballer. As a player, López had his most successful tenure on Independiente, where he won eight titles.

Player career 
López started playing in Unión Central of Villa María, Córdoba, then moving to Club Universitario. In 1963 he was traded to Sarmiento de Junín, then to Estudiantes de La Plata to make his debut in 1964. Three years later he signed for Ferro Carril Oeste in exchange for Felipe Ribaudo.

His good performances in Ferro led López to be capped for the Argentina national football team. At club level, he then moved to River Plate, then to Independiente, where he spent his most successful years as a player. With the Avellaneda team López won four Copa Libertadores (1972, 1973, 1974, 1975), three Copa Interamericana (1972, 1974, 1975) and one Intercontinental Cup in 1973 v Italian Juventus F.C.

After winning eight titles with Independiente, López emigrated to Colombia to play for Atlético Nacional, where he won the National championship in 1976.

Managerial career 
After retiring from football, López became a manager, starting to coach the youth divisions of Atlético Nacional in 1977. Two years later he returned to Argentina as Argentinos Juniors manager, where he coached rising star Diego Maradona. In 1980 he signed for Independiente, winning his first title, the friendly tournament "Torneo Villa de Madrid".

López returned to Colombia in 1982 to coach Atlético Nacional, where he spent a brief time before becoming manager of Boca Juniors but he only spent one season with the team. In 1984 López signed for Mexican Club américa, where he won the 1984–85 championship. After a season with Ferro C. Oeste in 1988, López made his third return to Colombia to manage Atlético Junior. His next team was C.D. Guadalajara in 1990.

References

Argentine footballers
Living people
1942 births
Association football defenders
Club Atlético Sarmiento footballers
Estudiantes de La Plata footballers
Ferro Carril Oeste footballers
Club Atlético River Plate footballers
Club Atlético Independiente footballers
Argentine expatriate footballers
Expatriate footballers in Colombia
Atlético Nacional footballers
Argentine football managers
Argentine expatriate football managers
Expatriate football managers in Colombia
Expatriate football managers in Mexico
Expatriate football managers in Ecuador
Expatriate football managers in Saudi Arabia
Expatriate football managers in Spain
Atlético Nacional managers
Atlético Junior managers
Argentinos Juniors managers
Club Atlético Independiente managers
Boca Juniors managers
Ferro Carril Oeste managers
Rosario Central managers
Club América managers
C.D. Guadalajara managers
Barcelona S.C. managers
Santos Laguna managers
Deportivo Toluca F.C. managers
Club León managers
Al-Ahli Saudi FC managers
Club Puebla managers
CD Badajoz managers
Arsenal de Sarandí managers